Pilodeudorix kallipygos is a butterfly in the family Lycaenidae. It is found in Cameroon. The habitat consists of primary forests.

References

Endemic fauna of Cameroon
Butterflies described in 1960
Deudorigini